Barbitistes constrictus is a species belonging to the family Tettigoniidae  subfamily Phaneropterinae. It is found in Austria, Belarus, Central European Russia, Czech Republic, Estonia, Germany, Hungary, Kaliningrad Region, Latvia, Lithuania, North European Russia, Northwest European Russia, Poland, Romania and Slovakia. The species is found mainly in coniferous forests .

References

Orthoptera of Europe
Insects described in 1878
Phaneropterinae